The Ministry of Health is a department of the Government of Syria.

History 
The ministry has been responsible for the COVID-19 pandemic in Syria.

Organization
The organizational structure of the Ministry consists of:
 Minister's Office Directorate
 Directorate of Internal Control
 Directorate of Planning and International Cooperation
 Service Centers Directorate
 Administrative Development Directorate
 Directorate of Human Resources
 Directorate of Legal Affairs
 Management accounting
 Information Technology Directorate
 Primary Health Care Directorate
 Directorate of Communicable and Chronic Diseases
 Directorate of Medical Equipment and Supplies
 Contracts Directorate
 Readiness Directorate
 Hospitals Directorate
 Department of Ambulance and Emergency
 Directorate of Pharmaceutical Affairs
 Drug Control Directorate الرقابة
 Directorate of Drug Control and Research Laboratories
 Directorate of Public Health Laboratories
 Health Professions Directorate
 Supply Directorate
 Directorate of Medical Engineering and Maintenance
 Building Directorate
 Directorate of Health Strategic Studies
 Directorate of Medical Records and Licensing
 Mental Health Directorate
 Rehabilitation Center and Prosthetics
 Directorate of Transport and Vehicles

Responsibilities 
The ministry is responsible for Health in Syria. The general objective of the Ministry, which was established in 1966, is to enhance the general health of the population by improving health indicators and achieving fairness in the distribution of health services assessed in coordination with other sectors and agencies. 

The Ministry is also concerned with establishing and organizing health institutions, raising the level of health awareness for citizens, and ensuring safe and effective medicine.

List of ministers 

 Bashir al-Azma
 Jamil Mardam Bey
 Badawi al-Jabal
 Wael Nader al-Halqi
 Saad Abdel-Salam al-Nayef
 Hassan al-Ghabbash

References

External links 
Page of the Government
Official Page of Ministry

Ministries established in 1966
Syrian ministers of health
Health ministries
Government ministries of Syria
Health
Lists of political office-holders in Syria
Health in Syria
All stub articles
Coordinates not on Wikidata